Qarah Aghaj-e Kushk (also Romanized as Qarah Āghāj-e Kūshk and Qareh Āghāj-e Kushk; also known as Qarah Āghāj-e Koshk) is a village in Charuymaq-e Jonubesharqi Rural District, Shadian District, Charuymaq County, East Azerbaijan Province, Iran. At the 2006 census, its population was 74, in 12 families.

References 

Populated places in Charuymaq County